Dena is a given name derived from Dinah and may refer to:
 Dena Atlantic, American television actress
 Dena DeRose (born 1966), American jazz pianist
 Dena Dietrich (1928–2020), American actress
 Dena Dubal, American neurodegenerative disease researcher
 Dena Epstein (1916–2013), American music librarian
 Dena Grayson (born 1971), American medical doctor
 Dena Head (born 1970), former Women's National Basketball Association player
 Dena G. Hernandez, neurogeneticist
 Dena Higley (born 1958), American soap opera writer
 Dena Kaplan (born 1989), South African-born Australian actress
 Dena Kaye (born 1946), daughter of actor Danny Kaye
 Dena Kennedy, New Zealand actress
 Dena Landon (born 1978), children's fiction fantasy writer
 Dena Schlosser (born 1969), American murderer
 Dena Tauriello, drummer for the rock band Antigone Rising since 1998

See also
 Deena, another given name

Feminine given names